Eskovia is a genus of dwarf spiders that was first described by Y. M. Marusik & Michael I. Saaristo in 1999.  it contains only two species: E. exarmata and E. mongolica.

The male carapace in both members of this genus has a distinct shape, appearing roughly trapezoidal in profile, especially in E. exarmata.

See also
 List of Linyphiidae species (A–H)

References

Araneomorphae genera
Linyphiidae
Spiders of Asia
Spiders of North America